Topo Gigio is an Italian animated children's television series produced by Topo Gigio s.r.l. and Movimenti Production for Rai Ragazzi. It premiered on Rai YoYo on October 5, 2020. The series is based on the 1958 character of the same name by Maria Perego; this is the last project for the franchise she had worked on, with her husband, before her death in 2019.

This marks the second television series for Topo Gigio to be produced, following the 1988 anime series.

Plot
Topo Gigio follows the adventures of the title character. Accompanying him are his best friend Zoe, a little girl who helps to make things right, his buddy Bike Bob, who he rides with in the city of Townville, and the G-Team (Mole, Pigeon, Bunny Twins, Turtle, and Toad) — a pair of cute critters who only Gigio can understand — who he can call upon using his Gigio Watch. Together, they make it their mission to solve any problem in the city of Townville, travelling with the help of the G-Bus that Bob built.

Characters

Main
 Topo Gigio defines the concept of unique. People on the street might look at him suspiciously - who is this? A child, a mouse? But his friends appreciate him for his enthusiasm and his fresh outlook. Because Gigio can see everything from another perspective and manages to pull everyone into his crazy adventures. To Gigio everything is new! He is among the most naïfs characters on the planet... yet, he is supremely confident: when he has an idea, he may be 100%, but that doesn't deter him! Gigio is an adorable charmer, he can melt your heart by whipping out his guitar and crooning a ballad to you. But below the surface, what he really needs is to be cuddled and kissed! Overall, he is a unique, free-spirited, very enthusiastic and confident mouse, even when he doesn't have any experience or capability. At the end of each adventure, he has only one request: "Kiss me goodnight and... Hug me 'til I pop!". He is voiced by Roly Gutierrez in English, and Claudio Moneta in Italian.
 Zoe is a 9-year-old girl who is Gigio's best friend and the perfect counterbalance to his free-spirited outlook. Where Gigio is spontaneous and carefree, Zoe is structured and certain. She makes a list of "how to do it properly" rules for almost everything. Her life was totally under control until Topo Gigio arrived (still, much less fun!). Zoe is curious, she loves new things (mostly SCIENTIFIC new things). She desires to be the best at everything and she loves to prove how smart she is. However, her need for perfection sometimes turns her into an over-achieving mega-klutz. Zoe deeply loves Gigio. They complement each other. She's a knowledgeable teacher, and he is a fun-loving friend that gets her out of her books. Her passions are: Gigio, science, school... and Bike Bob! She is voiced by Jackie Rodriguez in English, and Stefania De Peppe in Italian.
 Bike Bob, or simply Bob, is a 10-year-old boy, and a buddy of Zoe and Gigio. He rides his bike around town all the time, seemingly 24-7, hence/thus his name. Zoe, Gigio and Bob have become fast friends. Bob is the one who "tampered" with Zoe's remote controlled helicopter, and turned it into the GCopter, and invented the GBus. Bob is a "why not" kinda sorta guy. (Zoe has at least 25 specific reasons why not. She lists them. But he was thinking of something else as she did, so he missed them all - he votes yes!). He is quite gullible, like Gigio. He thinks he can speak with ghosts, or with aliens... he also thinks that the school's principal is a robot. He is also quite an inventor, who always has a brand new invention to help them in their daily adventures. Unfortunately, most the time it won't work! He is voiced by Kevin Rodriguez in English, and Manfredi Mo in Italian.
 The G-Team are Gigio's comical best animal friends. Gigio always enlists them to go on missions with him - even if it's a bad idea. He calls them with the Gigio Watch, which summons them by emitting ultrasound. All of them are comical characters, and they provide minion-like slapstick as they get stuff wrong and screw up plans. They all speaks gibberish and animal language that only Gigio understands - he's their interpreter for all forms of communication in the human world. This oughta go well... They have their headquarter in the Zoe's old treehouse, hidden from Zoe's parents! They are voiced by Rosana Smith-Alvarez, Roly Gutierrez, and Daniel Cortes.
 The Bunny Twins are never apart from each other (they never have been and they never would be). They are quite clever, and, most of all... they are cute and coy! This is very useful when you have to distract a group of people (or parents!) while sneaking into a building. They are a dynamic duo who are treated like a unit on one end, and at the same time, they are just a bit competitive with each other. The male bunny is orange, and the female bunny is light purple. Voiced by Isis Cristal Leyva & Mauriett Chayeb.
 Mole is Gigio's first mate and sidekick, who is eager to do whatever he asks, if anything. He just can't stop laughing. He can't see anything without his glasses, and he actually loves wearing glasses (he tries on every pair of glasses he encounters) but he digs fast with his paws and he can move so rapidly that you don't even notice he has moved.
 Pigeon has pumped up with loads of self-importance and acts outlandishly heroic. He fancies himself a comic book action hero. He most likely will shove you out of the way to save your life. He poses like a super hero, with his wings on his hips. He flies (that is his strength), but if he sees crumbs... he forgets his mission and immediately goes for them.
 Turtle moves really slow, so slow that she is still leaving just as everyone is returning. She only ever says one word: "salad". But, at the very least, she has learned one human word! She loves speed and when they get the GBus she can't resist herself and leans her head out the window (or the bag) kind of like what a dog does regularly...!
 Toad is a clinical narcissist. He fervently believes that he is a handsome prince and dreams of being showered with kisses by Zoe... who finds him less than attractive! He loves to stare at his reflection. He is big and heavy and he keeps croaking all the time... even when they are on an important mission. But he is strong and this can be very useful. He uses his retractable tongue to point at things if the situation requires.

Recurring
 Laura is Zoe's pragmatic mother. At work, Zoe’s mother is a hard‐charging, get‐things‐done scientist, but at home she’s a sweet, caring Mom (in a hard‐charging, get‐things‐done kinda way). Mom is obviously the most pragmatic parent in this family, and we think that’s where Zoe got her organizational and time management skills. Mom is often busy at work, so when she returns home, she’s a great force of calm... like an air conditioner that cools the whole situation down. Which makes everyone wonder why life can’t always be like this. She is voiced by Rosana Smith-Alvarez in English, and Renata Bertolas in Italian.
 Gregory is Zoe's emotional father and the artistic counterbalance to the scientist. He’s emotional and sensitive, which helps because he’s a professional magazine photographer. Since Gregory works at home with many high‐stake situations — deadlines, celebrities, delicate food shoots — he often ends up being the apple cart that’s going to be upset. He’s prone to emotional reactions when it goes wrong, sometimes in a theatrical all‐is‐lost Shakespearean way. He is voiced by Travis Ring in English, and Marcello Cortese in Italian.
 Emilia, Emy to all of her friends, is Zoe's best friend. She is quite shy, but has a great vocal talent. We would like to have Gigio and Emy singing together! She has a female cat, Meowie, who become's Gigio's friend. She is voiced by Andrea Villaverde in English, and Laura Cherubelli in Italian.
 Twyla is a real African-American fashionista. She is always on top of the trends and unquestioning trendiness is her mantra. Gigio is always thrilled about the "chic new fashion objects" she always brings! She is often competitive with Zoe, but she is still good friends with her and one of her best friends too. She loves her "cutie" and extremely scary dog: Dogzilla. She is voiced by Angeline Fontaine in English, and Ludovica De Caro in Italian.
 Tatum is a school bully that everyone is afraid of, especially Gigio. He loves his Granny, who he loves, and who has no idea nor has she got the faintest clue that he is a bully and dotes on him regardless and nonetheless... her beloved little grandson! But eventually, he still one of the group. He is voiced by Michael Mena in English, and Paolo De Santis in Italian.
 Jo is the straight-arrow know-it-all guy, he likes science exactly like Zoe. Actually... therefore, he has a crush on her! Every time he sees her, he says "hello Zoe" (that is if he can say hello to her more than a dozen times per day, like a normal crazy person could, would, or should). At school he offers her his extremely healthy and organic lunch his mum prepared for him, hoping it will bring him closer to his fantasy. He is voiced by Daniel Cortes in English, and Mosè Singh in Italian.

Production
Topo Gigio is an animated adaptation of the character of the same name that was created by Italian artist Maria Perego, and her husband Federico Caldura, in 1958. It was produced entirely in Italy between Milan and Florence by Topo Gigio s.r.l. and Movimenti Production, in collaboration with Rai Ragazzi. Both Perego and Caldura had worked on this show, the former also being a creator of it, up until her death on November 7, 2019. The show is now dedicated in "loving memory" of her, as shown by a card at the end of each episode.

Early promotional material reveal that the show was originally titled "Topo Gigio: The New Animated Series". Zoe and her parents underwent severe design changes, although Gigio remained the same. Just as well, the G-Team had completely different members, including that of a flamingo, a panda, a toucan, a wolf cub, a cat, and a beaver.

Despite being produced in Italy, the original version of the show is English, as opposed to Italian. The English version was produced by Centauro Comunicaciones in their Miami, Florida division.

The series is distributed worldwide by For Fun Distribution, and in the United States by the New York-based Lacey Entertainment.

Episodes

Release
Topo Gigio first premiered in Italy on Rai YoYo on October 5, 2020, with an Italian dub, although 13 episodes were released prior to RaiPlay on April 8, 2020, in order to cheer up Italian families during wake of the COVID-19 pandemic.

The original English version was first broadcast on Canal Panda's Spanish feed, on its English-language audio track, on July 1, 2021. It will also air on the English-language audio track of Discovery Kids in Latin America on October 18, 2021.

Two episodes were released prior to ForFun Entertainment's Vimeo channel on October 1 and October 3, 2019 ("Journey to Mars" and "Bob the Bomb" respectively). These two episodes have a different opening sequence for the show that was not used in the finalized version; the footage of it still remains remotely the same. Another episode was uploaded on July 2, 2020, "The Hiccup", now using the proper intro.

Notes

References

External links
 
 
 Topo Gigio on For Fun Distribution
 Topo Gigio on Lacey Entertainment
 Topo Gigio on RaiPlay

2020 animated television series debuts
2020 Italian television series debuts
Animated television series about children
Animated television series about mice and rats
Italian-language television shows
English-language television shows
Italian children's animated adventure television series
Italian children's animated comedy television series